ROKS An Jung-geun (SS-075) is the third boat of the Sohn Won-yil-class submarine in the Republic of Korea Navy. She is named after the Korean nationalist, An Jung-geun.

Design 

There are media reports that the Sohn Won-yil is equipped with eight 533 mm torpedo tubes, and that South Korea will mount a South Korean cruise missile, Hyunmoo-3, with a range of 500 km. It is said that they are also developing versions with a range of 1000 km and 1500 km, but there was no confirmation of whether this version could be mounted on a 533mm torpedo tube. Originally, the American Tomahawk missile was conceptually designed to be launched from a 533mm torpedo tube. South Korea has also recently succeeded in localizing it.

The Cheonryong missile with a range of 500 km has been installed in the Sohn Won-yil-class and has been deployed and is in operation.

Germany, which exported the Sohn Won-yil-class (class 214), is using a Type 212 submarine that uses the same AIP system with the same displacement. It has a range of 20 km, and is equipped with four 533 mm torpedo tube, and is capable against air, surface, and submarine targets.

Construction and career 
ROKS An Jung-geun was launched on 4 June 2008 by Hyundai Heavy Industries and commissioned on 1 December 2009.

References

Attack submarines
2008 ships
Ships built by Hyundai Heavy Industries Group
Type 214 submarines
An Jung-geun